Associação Atlética Portuguesa, commonly referred to as Portuguesa Santista, is a professional football club based in Santos, São Paulo, Brazil. The team competes in Campeonato Paulista Série A2, the second tier of the São Paulo state football league.

Founded in 1917 by the Portuguese descendants of the city, they play in red shirts, red shorts and socks. The club's mascot is a female donkey. The club's nickname, Briosa, was given between 1918 and 1920, when the club competed in several amateur football festivals. Briosa means courageous, graceful, in Portuguese.

History

In November 1914, Pedreira do Contorno workers, in Jabaquara neighborhood, Santos, were watching Espanha Futebol Clube matches and dreaming about creating a football club on their own. On 20 November 1917, Manoel Tavares had a meeting at Alexandre Coelho's barber shop, with 15 other people, who decided to found a club honoring Portugal. The name they chose was Associação Atlética Portuguesa and Lino do Carmo was elected as the club's first president.

The club's first match was played on 5 December 1920, when they beat Sírio Futebol Clube 6–0 at Estádio Ulrico Mursa.

In 1950, Portuguesa Santista had its first trip to another country. In Portugal, the club played seven matches, winning five of them and losing the other two.

In 1959, Portuguesa Santista traveled to Portuguese-ruled African territories at the time, playing against Angolan and Mozambican clubs. The team won all the 15 matches they played, scoring 75 goals and conceding 10. Because of this great performance, Portuguesa Santista won Fita Azul do Futebol Brasileiro (Brazilian Football Blue Ribbon in English), given to the club which succeeds in trips to another countries.

In 1964, Portuguesa won the second division of Campeonato Paulista (currently known as Campeonato Paulista Série A2), gaining promotion to the following year's first division.

In 1997, the club competed in Brazilian Championship Third Level, but was eliminated in the first stage.

In 2004, Portuguesa Santista competed in Copa do Brasil, being eliminated in the first round by 15 de Novembro of Campo Bom, Rio Grande do Sul.

Portuguesa Santista was the first youth club of Neymar, who as of 2022 plays for French club Paris Saint-Germain and the Brazil national team.

Achievements

Domestic
 Campeonato Paulista Série A2
 Winners (4): 1932, 1933, 1934, 1964
 Campeonato Paulista Segunda Divisão
 Winners (1): 2016
 Fita Azul do Futebol Brasileiro
 Winners (1): 1959

Fita Azul do Futebol Brasileiro (Brazilian Football Blue Ribbon) was an award given for the club which succeeds in an excursion out of the country.

Stadium

Portuguesa Santista's stadium is Estádio Ulrico Mursa, built in 1920, with a maximum capacity of approximately 7,600 people.

References

External links

 Official website

 
Association football clubs established in 1917
1917 establishments in Brazil
Football clubs in São Paulo (state)
Portuguese-Brazilian culture
Diaspora football clubs in Brazil